A cryptocurrency bubble is a phenomenon where the market increasingly considers the going price of cryptocurrency assets to be inflated against their hypothetical value. The history of cryptocurrency has been marked by several speculative bubbles.

Some economists and prominent investors have expressed the view that the entire cryptocurrency market constitutes a speculative bubble. Adherents of this view include Berkshire Hathaway board member Warren Buffett and several laureates of the Nobel Memorial Prize in Economic Sciences, central bankers, and investors.

History

2011 booms and crashes 
This spike was encouraged by several Slashdot posts about it. This came after attention from a Gawker article about the dark web market Silk Road. The price then fell to  that November.

2013 boom and 2014–15 crash 

2017 boom and 2018 crash 

The 2018 cryptocurrency crash (also known as the Bitcoin crash and the Great crypto crash) was the sell-off of most cryptocurrencies starting in January 2018. After an unprecedented boom in 2017, the price of Bitcoin fell by about 65% from 6 January to 6 February 2018. Subsequently, nearly all other cryptocurrencies followed Bitcoin's crash. By September 2018, cryptocurrencies collapsed 80% from their peak in January 2018, making the 2018 cryptocurrency crash worse than the dot-com bubble's 78% collapse. By 26 November, Bitcoin also fell by 80% from its peak, having lost almost one-third of its value in the previous week.

A January 2018 article by CBS cautioned about possible fraud, citing the case of BitConnect, a British company which received a cease-and-desist order from the Texas State Securities Board. BitConnect had promised very high monthly returns but had not registered with state securities regulators or given their office address.

In November 2018, the total market capitalization for Bitcoin fell below $100 billion for the first time since October 2017, and the price of Bitcoin fell below $4,000, representing an 80 percent decline from its peak the previous January. Bitcoin reached a low of around $3,100 in December 2018.

Timeline of the crash 
17 December 2017: Bitcoin's price briefly reaches a new all-time high of $19,783.06.
22 December 2017: Bitcoin falls below $11,000, a fall of 45% from its peak.
12 January 2018: Amidst rumors that South Korea could be preparing to ban trading in cryptocurrency, the price of Bitcoin depreciates by 12 percent.
26 January 2018: Coincheck, Japan's largest cryptocurrency OTC market, is hacked. US$530 million of the NEM are stolen by the hacker, causing Coincheck to indefinitely suspend trading. The loss is the largest ever so far by an incident of theft.
7 March 2018: Compromised Binance API keys are used to execute irregular trades.
Late March 2018: Facebook, Google, and Twitter ban advertisements for initial coin offerings (ICO) and token sales.
15 November 2018: Bitcoin's market capitalization falls below $100 billion for the first time since October 2017 and the price of Bitcoin falls to $5,500.

Initial coin offerings 
Wired noted in 2017 that the bubble in initial coin offerings (ICOs) was about to burst. Some investors bought ICOs in hopes of participating in the financial gains similar to those enjoyed by early Bitcoin or Ethereum speculators.

Binance has been one of the biggest winners in this boom as it surged to become the largest cryptocurrency trading platform by volume. It lists hundreds of digital tokens on its exchange.

In June 2018, Ella Zhang of Binance Labs, a division of the cryptocurrency exchange Binance, stated that she was hoping to see the bubble in ICOs collapse. She promised to help "fight scams and shit coins".

2020–2022 cryptocurrency bubble

2020–2021 bubbles 
From 8 March to 12 March 2020, the price of Bitcoin fell by 30 percent from $8,901 to $6,206. By October 2020, Bitcoin was worth approximately $13,200.

In November 2020, Bitcoin again surpassed its previous all-time high of over $19,000. After another surge on 3 January 2021 with $34,792.47, Bitcoin crashed by 17 percent the next day. Bitcoin traded above $40,000 for the first time on 8 January 2021 and reached $50,000 on 16 February 2021. On Wednesday, 20 October 2021, Bitcoin reached a new all-time high of $66,974.

In early 2021, Bitcoin's price witnessed another boom, rising over 700% since March 2020, and reaching above $40,000 for the first time on 7 January. On 11 January, the UK Financial Conduct Authority warned investors against lending or investments in cryptoassets, that they should be prepared "to lose all their money". On 16 February, Bitcoin reached $50,000 for the first time. On 13 March, Bitcoin surpassed $61,000 for the first time. Following a smaller correction in February, Bitcoin plunged from its peak above $64,000 on 14 April to below $49,000 on 23 April, representing a 23% mini-crash in less than 10 days, dipping below the March bottom trading range and wiping half a trillion dollars from the combined crypto market cap.

On 14 April, Coinbase, a much hyped crypto exchange went public on the NASDAQ. Their shared grew by over 31% on their first day to $328.28 pushing their market cap to $85.8B.

Other cryptocurrencies' prices also sharply rose, then followed by losses of value during this period. In May 2021, the value of Dogecoin, originally created as a joke, increased to 20,000% of value in one year. It then dropped 34% over the weekend.

By 19 May, Bitcoin had dropped in value by 30% to $31,000, Ethereum by 40%, and Dogecoin by 45%. Nearly all cryptocurrencies were down by double-digit percentages. Major cryptocurrency exchanges went down amid a market-wide price crash. This was partly in response to Elon Musk's announcement that Tesla would suspend payments using the Bitcoin network due to environmental concerns, along with an announcement from the People's Bank of China reiterating that digital currencies cannot be used for payments.

Bitcoin and other cryptocurrencies experienced a solid recovery after Elon Musk met with leading Bitcoin mining companies to develop more sustainable and efficient Bitcoin mining. After bottoming out on July 19, by early September Bitcoin had reached $52,633.54 while Ethereum grew by over 100% to $3,952.13. After a short but significant fall, both crypto's peaked on November 7, 2021 at $67,566.83 and $4,812.09, respectively. The NASDAQ would peak 12 days later on November 19 at 16,057.44. Since bottoming out after the covid crash in 2020, Bitcoin had grown over 1,200% in value while Ethereum had grown over 4,000% in value while the NASDAQ had only grown around 134%.

In September, Bitcoin officially became a legal tender in El Salvador with many news sources wondering what countries would be next.

As of October 2021, China has continued shutting down crypto trading and mining activities, and Tesla has not yet resumed payments with Bitcoin.

2021–2023 crash 
After their peak, the crypto market began to fall with the rest of the market. By the end of 2021, Bitcoin had fallen nearly 30% from its peak down to $47,686.81 and Ethereum had fallen about 23% to $3,769.70. In December 2022, The Washington Post reported "the sense that the crypto bubble has definitively popped, taking with it billions of dollars of investments made by regular people, pension funds, venture capitalists and traditional companies".

Collapse of Terra-Luna 

In May 2022, the stablecoin TerraUSD fell to US$0.10. This was supposed to be pegged to the US dollar via a complex algorithmic relationship with its support coin Luna. The loss of the peg resulted in Luna falling to almost zero, down from its high of $119.51. The collapse wiped out $45billion of market capitalization in a week. On 25 May, a proposal was approved to reissue a new Luna cryptocurrency and to decouple from and abandon the devalued UST stablecoin. The new Luna coin lost value in the opening days of being listed on exchanges.

In the wake of Terra-Luna's collapse, another algorithmic stablecoin, DEI, lost its peg to the dollar and started to collapse.

Private litigation in the United States

On January 7, 2022, a class-action lawsuit was filed against EthereumMax alleging it to be a pump and dump scheme with media personality Kim Kardashian, former professional boxer Floyd Mayweather Jr., former NBA player Paul Pierce, and other celebrities also being named in the lawsuit for promoting the Ether cryptocurrency on their social media accounts.

On February 18, the United States Court of Appeals for the Eleventh Circuit ruled in a lawsuit against Bitconnect that the Securities Act of 1933 extends to targeted solicitation using social media.

On the same day, a class-action lawsuit was filed against SafeMoon alleging it to also be a pump and dump scheme with professional boxer Jake Paul, musician Nick Carter, rappers Soulja Boy and Lil Yachty, and social media personality Ben Phillips also being named in the lawsuit for promoting the SafeMoon cryptocurrency with misleading information on their social media accounts.

On April 1, a class-action lawsuit was filed in Florida against the LGBcoin cryptocurrency company, NASCAR, professional stock car racing driver Brandon Brown, and political commentator Candace Owens alleging that the defendants made false or misleading statements about the LGBcoin and that the founders of the company had engaged in a pump and dump scheme.

On April 13, Coinbase received a class-action securities fraud lawsuit from its shareholders for including false and misleading statements and omissions in the registration statement and prospectus of its initial public offering.

On June 13, Binance received a class-action lawsuit from more than 2,000 investors accusing the company of false advertising in promoting TerraUSD.

On June 17, TerraForm Labs received a class-action lawsuit in the United States alleging the company misled investors in violation of federal and California securities laws in marketing its cryptocurrencies in a manner that resembled securities.

On July 7, Celsius Network received a lawsuit from a former cryptocurrency investment manager alleging the company failed to implement adequate risk management strategies or accounting practices to hedge the firm against cryptocurrency price fluctuations and protect its ability to repay its depositors, and that the company was operating an effective Ponzi scheme.

On July 21, an ex-Coinbase employee and 2 other men were charged with wire fraud and conspiracy to commit wire fraud. This marked the first time charges were brought to people involving crypto assets.

Collapse of FTX 

In early November, Binance, one of the largest crypto exchanges in the world, announced it would be dissolving its holdings in FTX Token (FTT) with reports that most of FTX liquidity was based in this coin and was very unstable. This resulted in a run on FTX resulting in 90% of all FTT being withdrawn. The price of FTT fell from $22 on November 7 to under $5.00 on November 8, an 80% drop. Abracadabra.com's stablecoin "magic internet money" (MIM) also briefly lost its peg to the US dollar for the first time since May 2022. This all resulted in a liquidity crisis with the company unable to pay off the withdrawls. On November 8, rival Binance announced plans to buy the company to save it from collapse. This sent shockwaves through the crypto market and led to a 10% drop in Bitcoin price and a 15% drop in Ether price. The following day, however, Binance immediately withdrew its offer causing Bitcoin and Ether to plummet another 14% and 16%, respectively, to their lowest levels since November 2020. The same day, the SEC and Justice Department launched an investigation into the company. FTX filed for bankruptcy protection on November 11.

Characterization as 'bubble' 

Bitcoin has been characterized as a speculative bubble by eight winners of the Nobel Memorial Prize in Economic Sciences: Paul Krugman, Robert J. Shiller,  Joseph Stiglitz, Richard Thaler, James Heckman, Thomas Sargent, Angus Deaton, and Oliver Hart; and by central bank officials including Alan Greenspan, Agustín Carstens, Vítor Constâncio, and Nout Wellink.

The investors Warren Buffett and George Soros have respectively characterized it as a "mirage" and a "bubble", while the business executives Jack Ma and J.P. Morgan Chase CEO Jamie Dimon have called it a "bubble" and a "fraud", respectively. However, Dimon said later he regrets calling Bitcoin a fraud.

Other notable skeptics are Bill Gates, Microsoft co-founder and philanthropist; Bruce Schneier, cryptographer, computer security expert, and public policy lecturer at Harvard University; and Molly White, author of the Web3 Is Going Just Great website.

See also 
 , a broader overview of the history of blockchain technology
  
 Cryptocurrency and crime
 Crypto Ponzi scheme

References

Further reading

Economic bubbles
Bubble
Financial markets
2020s economic history